United Airlines Flight 232 was a regularly scheduled United Airlines flight from Stapleton International Airport in Denver to O'Hare International Airport in Chicago, continuing to Philadelphia International Airport.  On July 19, 1989, the DC-10 (registered as N1819U) serving the flight crash-landed at Sioux Gateway Airport in Sioux City, Iowa, after suffering a catastrophic failure of its tail-mounted engine due to an unnoticed manufacturing defect in the engine's fan disk, which resulted in the loss of many flight controls. Of the 296 passengers and crew on board, 112 died during the accident, while 184 people survived. It is the deadliest single-aircraft accident in the history of United Airlines.

Despite the deaths, the accident is considered a good example of successful crew resource management because of the large number of survivors and the manner in which the flight crew managed the emergency and landed the airplane without conventional control. It has been termed "The Impossible Landing" and is considered one of the most impressive landings ever performed in the history of aviation.

Aircraft 
The airplane, a McDonnell Douglas DC-10-10 (registration ), was delivered in 1971 and owned by United Airlines since then. Before departure on the flight from Denver on July 19, 1989, the airplane had been operated for a total of 43,401 hours and 16,997 cycles (takeoff-landing pairs). The airplane was powered by CF6-6D high bypass-ratio turbofan engines produced by General Electric Aircraft Engines (GEAE). The aircraft's No. 2 (tail-mounted) engine had accumulated 42,436 hours and 16,899 cycles of operating time immediately prior to the accident flight.

The DC-10 used three independent hydraulic systems, each powered by one of the aircraft's three engines, to power movement of the aircraft's flight controls. In the event of loss of engine power or primary pump failure, a ram air turbine could provide emergency electrical power for electrically powered auxiliary pumps. These systems were designed to be redundant, such that if two hydraulic systems were inoperable, the one remaining hydraulic system would still permit the full operation and control of the airplane. However, at least one hydraulic system must have fluid present and the ability to hold fluid pressure to control the aircraft. Like other widebody transport aircraft of the time, the DC-10 was not designed to revert to unassisted manual control in the event of total hydraulic failure. The DC-10's hydraulic system was designed and demonstrated to the Federal Aviation Administration (FAA) as compliant with regulations that "no single [engine] failure or malfunction or probable combination of failures will jeopardize the safe operation of the airplane..."

Crew 

Flight 232's captain, Alfred C. "Al" Haynes, 57, was hired by United Airlines in 1956. He had 29,967 hours of total flight time with United, of which 7,190 were in the DC-10.

Haynes' co-pilot was first officer William R. "Bill" Records, 48.  He estimated that he had approximately 20,000 hours of total flight time. He was hired first by National Airlines in 1969. He worked subsequently for Pan American World Airways. He was hired by United in 1985, and had accrued 665 hours as a DC-10 first officer while at United.

Flight Engineer Dudley J. Dvorak, 51, was hired by United Airlines in 1986. He estimated that he had about 15,000 hours of total flying time. While working for United, he had accumulated 1,903 hours as a flight engineer in the Boeing 727 and 33 hours as a flight engineer in the DC-10.

Dennis E. "Denny" Fitch, 46, a training-check airman aboard Flight 232 as a passenger, was hired by United in 1968. He estimated that, prior to working for United, he had accrued at least 1,400 hours of flight time with the Air National Guard, with a total flight time around 23,000 hours.  His total DC-10 time with United was 2,987 hours, including 1,943 hours accrued as a flight engineer, 965 hours as a first officer, and 79 hours as a captain. Fitch had learned of the 1985 crash of Japan Air Lines Flight 123, caused by a catastrophic loss of hydraulic control, and had wondered if it was possible to control an aircraft using throttles only.  He had practiced with similar conditions on a simulator.

Eight flight attendants (Jan Brown, Georgeann Delcastillo, Barbara Gillespie, Rene Lebeau, Donna McGrady, Virginia Murray, Tim Owens, and Susan White) were also aboard the flight.

Events

Takeoff and engine failure 
Flight 232 lifted off from Stapleton International Airport in Denver at 14:09 Central Daylight Time, en route to O'Hare International Airport in Chicago with continuing service to Philadelphia. (For convenience, all times in this article are provided in Central Daylight Time, consistent with local time for the crash site in Iowa and the NTSB report).

The uncontained failure resulted in the engine's fan disk departing the aircraft, tearing out components including parts of the No. 2 hydraulic system and supply hoses in the process; these were later found near Alta, Iowa. Engine debris penetrated the aircraft's tail section in numerous places, including the horizontal stabilizer, severing the No. 1 and No. 3 hydraulic system lines where they passed through the horizontal stabilizer.

The pilots felt a jolt, and the autopilot disengaged. As First Officer Records took hold of his control column, Captain Haynes concentrated on the tail engine, the instruments for which indicated it was malfunctioning; he found its throttle and fuel supply controls jammed. At Dvorak's suggestion, a valve for fuel to the tail engine was shut off. This part of the emergency took 14 seconds.

Attempts to control the plane 

Meanwhile, Records found that the airplane did not respond to his control column. Even with the control column turned all the way to the left, commanding maximum left aileron, and pulled all the way back, commanding maximum up elevatorinputs that would never be used together in normal flightthe aircraft was banking to the right with the nose dropping. Haynes attempted to level the aircraft with his own control column, then both Haynes and Records tried using their control columns together, but the aircraft still did not respond. Afraid the aircraft would roll into a completely inverted position (an unrecoverable situation), the crew reduced the left wing-mounted engine to idle and applied maximum power to the right engine. This caused the airplane to level slowly.

While Haynes and Records performed the engine shutdown checklist for the failed engine, Dvorak observed that the gauges for fluid pressure and quantity in all three hydraulic systems were indicating zero. The loss of all hydraulic fluid meant that control surfaces were inoperative. The flight crew deployed the DC-10's air-driven generator in an attempt to restore hydraulic power by powering the auxiliary hydraulic pumps, but this was unsuccessful. The crew contacted United Airlines maintenance personnel via radio, but were told that the possibility of a total loss of hydraulics in a DC-10 was considered so remote that no procedure was established for such an event.

The airplane was tending to pull right, and oscillated slowly vertically in a phugoid cyclecharacteristic of planes in which control surface command is lost. Fitch, an experienced United Airlines captain and DC-10 flight instructor, was among the passengers and volunteered to assist. The message was relayed by senior flight attendant Jan Brown Lohr to the flight crew, who invited Fitch into the cockpit; he arrived and began assisting at about 15:29.

Haynes asked Fitch to observe the ailerons through the passenger cabin windows to see if control inputs were having any effect. Fitch reported back that the ailerons were not moving at all. Nonetheless, the crew continued to manipulate their control columns for the remainder of the flight, hoping for at least some effect. Haynes then asked Fitch to take control of the throttles so that Haynes could concentrate on his control column. With one throttle in each hand, Fitch was able to mitigate the phugoid cycle and make rough steering adjustments.

Air traffic control (ATC) was contacted and an emergency landing at nearby Sioux Gateway Airport was organized. Haynes kept his sense of humor during the emergency, as recorded by the airplane's cockpit voice recorder (CVR):

 Fitch: "I'll tell you what, we'll have a beer when this is all done."
 Haynes: "Well I don't drink, but I'll sure as hell have one."

and later:

 Sioux City Approach: "United Two Thirty-Two Heavy, the wind's currently three six zero at one one; three sixty at eleven. You're cleared to land on any runway."
 Haynes: "[laughter] Roger. [laughter] You want to be particular and make it a runway, huh?"

A more serious remark often quoted from Haynes was made when ATC asked the crew to make a left turn to keep them clear of the city:

 Haynes: "Whatever you do, keep us away from the city."

Haynes later noted, "We were too busy [to be scared]. You must maintain your composure in the airplane, or you will die. You learn that from your first day flying."

Crash landing
As the crew began to prepare for arrival at Sioux Gateway Airport, they questioned whether they should deploy the landing gear or belly-land the aircraft with the gear retracted. They decided that having the landing gear down would provide some shock absorption on impact. The complete hydraulic failure left the landing gear lowering mechanism inoperative. Two options were available to the flight crew. The DC-10 is designed so that if hydraulic pressure to the landing gear is lost, the gear will fall down slightly and rest on the landing gear doors. Placing the regular landing gear handle in the down position will unlock the doors mechanically, and the doors and landing gear will then fall down into place and lock due to gravity. An alternative system is also available using a lever in the cockpit floor to cause the landing gear to fall into position. This lever has the added benefit of unlocking the outboard ailerons, which are not used in high-speed flight and are locked in a neutral position. The crew hoped that there might be some trapped hydraulic fluid in the outboard ailerons and that they might regain some use of flight controls by unlocking them. They elected to extend the gear with the alternative system. Although the gear deployed successfully, no change of the controllability of the aircraft resulted.

Landing was originally planned for  Runway 31. Difficulties in controlling the aircraft made alignment with the runway almost impossible. While dumping some of the excess fuel, the airplane executed a series of mostly right-hand turns (turning the airplane in this direction was easier) with the intention of aligning with Runway 31. When they finished they were instead aligned with the closed  Runway 22, and had little capacity to maneuver. Fire trucks had been placed on Runway 22, anticipating a landing on nearby Runway 31, so all the vehicles were quickly moved out of the way before the airplane touched down. Runway 22 had been closed permanently a year earlier.

ATC also advised that a four-lane Interstate highway ran north and south just east of the airport, which they could land on if they did not think they could make the runway. Captain Haynes replied that they were passing over the interstate at that time and they would try for the runway instead.

Fitch continued to control the aircraft's descent by adjusting engine thrust. With the loss of all hydraulics, the flaps could not be extended, and since flaps control both the minimum required forward speed and sink rate, the crew was unable to control either airspeed and sink rate. Moments before landing, the roll to the right suddenly worsened significantly and the aircraft began to pitch forward into a dive; Fitch realized this and pushed both throttles to full power in a desperate, last ditch attempt to level the plane. It was now 16:00. The CVR recorded these final moments:

 Records: "Close 'em off."

 Haynes: "Left turn, close 'em off."

 Records: "Pull 'em all off."

 Fitch: "Nah, I can't pull 'em off or we'll lose it, that's what's turning ya."

 Records: "Okay."

 Fitch:  "Back, Al!"

 Haynes: "Left, left throttle, left, left, left, left, left, left, left, left, left, left, left!"

 Ground Proximity Warning System: "Whoop whoop pull up. Whoop whoop pull up. Whoop whoop pull up."

 Haynes: "Everybody stay in brace!"

 GPWS: "Whoop whoop pull up."

 Haynes: "God!"

 [Sound of impact]

 End of recording.

The engines were not able to respond to Fitch's controls in time to stop the roll, and the airplane impacted the ground with its right wing, spilling fuel which ignited immediately. The tail section broke off from the force of the impact, and the rest of the aircraft bounced several times, shedding the landing gear and engine nacelles and breaking the fuselage into several main pieces. At final impact, the right wing was torn off and the main part of the aircraft skidded sideways, rolled over onto its back, and slid to a stop upside-down in a corn field to the right of Runway 22. Witnesses reported that the aircraft "cartwheeled" end-over-end, but the investigation did not confirm this. The reports were due to misinterpretation of the video of the crash that showed the flaming right wing tumbling end-over-end and the intact left wing, still attached to the fuselage, rolling up and over as the fuselage flipped over.

Injuries and deaths 

Of the 296 people aboard, 112 died in the accident. Most were killed by injuries sustained during the multiple impacts, but 35 people in the middle fuselage section directly above the fuel tanks died from smoke inhalation in the post-crash fire. Of those, 24 had no traumatic blunt-force injuries. The majority of the 184 survivors were seated behind first class and ahead of the wings. Many passengers were able to walk out through the ruptures to the structure.

Of all of the passengers:
 35 died because of smoke inhalation (none were in first class).
 76 died for reasons other than smoke inhalation (17 in first class).
 One died a month after the crash.
 47 were injured seriously (eight in first class).
 125 had minor injuries (one in first class).
 13 had no injuries (none in first class).

The passengers who died for reasons other than smoke inhalation were seated in rows 1–4, 24–25, and 28–38. Passengers who died because of smoke inhalation were seated in rows 14, 16, and 22–30. The person assigned to set 20H moved to an unknown seat and died of smoke inhalation.

One crash survivor died one month after the accident; he was classified according to NTSB regulations as a survivor with serious injuries.

Fifty-two children, including four "lap children" without their own seats, were aboard the flight because of a United Airlines promotion for "Children's Day". Eleven children, including one lap child, died. Many of the children were traveling alone.

Rescuers did not identify the debris that was the remains of the cockpit, with the four crew members alive inside, until 35 minutes after the crash. All four recovered from their injuries and eventually returned to flight duty.

Investigation 

The rear engine's fan disk and blade assemblyabout  acrosscould not be located at the accident scene despite an extensive search. The engine's manufacturer, General Electric, offered rewards of $50,000 for the disk and $1,000 for each fan blade. Three months after the crash, a farmer discovered most of the fan disk, with several blades still attached, in her cornfield, thereby qualifying her for a reward, as a General Electric lawyer confirmed. The rest of the fan disk and most of the additional blades were later found nearby.

The NTSB determined that the probable cause of this accident was the inadequate consideration given to human factors, and limitations of the inspection and quality control procedures used by United Airlines' engine overhaul facility. These resulted in the failure to detect a fatigue crack originating from a previously undetected metallurgical defect located in a critical area of the titanium-alloy stage-1 fan disk that was manufactured by General Electric Aircraft Engines. The uncontained manner in which the engine failed resulted in high-speed metal fragments being hurled from the engine; these fragments penetrated the hydraulic lines of all three independent hydraulic systems aboard the aircraft, which rapidly lost their hydraulic fluid. The subsequent catastrophic disintegration of the disk resulted in the liberation of debris in a pattern of distribution and with energy levels that exceeded the level of protection provided by design features of the hydraulic systems that operate the DC-10's flight controls; the flight crew lost its ability to operate nearly all of them.

Despite these losses, the crew was able to attain and then maintain limited control by using the throttles to adjust thrust from the remaining wing-mounted engines. By using each engine independently, the crew made rough steering adjustments, and by using the engines together they were able to roughly adjust altitude. The crew guided the crippled jet to Sioux Gateway Airport and aligned it for landing on one of the runways. Without the use of flaps and slats, they were unable to slow for landing, and were forced to attempt landing at a very high ground speed. The aircraft also landed at an extremely high rate of descent because of the inability to flare (reduce the rate of descent before touchdown by increasing pitch). As a result upon touchdown, the aircraft broke apart, rolled over, and caught fire. The largest section came to rest in a cornfield next to the runway. Despite the ferocity of the accident, 184 (62.2%) passengers and crew survived owing to a variety of factors including the relatively controlled manner of the crash and the early notification of emergency services.

Failed component

The investigation, while praising the actions of the flight crew for saving lives, later identified the cause of the accident as a failure by United Airlines maintenance processes and personnel to detect an existing fatigue crack. The Probable Cause in the report by the NTSB read as follows: 

Post-crash analysis of the crack surfaces showed the presence of a penetrating fluorescent dye used to detect cracks during maintenance. The presence of the dye indicated that the crack was present and should have been detected at a prior inspection. The detection failure arose from poor attention to human factors in United Airlines' specification of maintenance processes.

Investigators discovered an impurity and fatigue crack in the disk. Titanium reacts with air when melted, which creates impurities that can initiate fatigue cracks like that found in the crash disk. To prevent this, the ingot that would become the fan disk was formed using a "double vacuum" process: the raw materials were melted together in a vacuum, allowed to cool and solidify, then melted in a vacuum once more. After the double vacuum process, the ingot was shaped into a billet, a sausage-like form about 16 inches in diameter, and tested using ultrasound to look for defects. Defects were located and the ingot was processed further to remove them, but some nitrogen contamination remained. GE later added a third vacuum-forming stage because of their investigation into failing rotating titanium engine parts.

The contamination caused what is known as a hard alpha inclusion, where a contaminant particle in a metal alloy causes the metal around it to become brittle. The brittle titanium around the impurity then cracked during forging and fell out during final machining, leaving a cavity with microscopic cracks at the edges. For the next 18 years, the crack grew slightly each time the engine was powered up and brought to operating temperature. Eventually, the crack broke open, causing the disk to fail.

The origins of the crash disk are uncertain because of significant irregularities and gaps, noted in the NTSB report, in the manufacturing records of GE Aircraft Engines (GEAE) and its suppliers.  Records found after the accident indicated that two rough-machined forgings having the serial number of the crash disk had been routed through GEAE manufacturing. Records indicated that Alcoa supplied GE with TIMET titanium forgings for one disk with the serial number of the crash disk. Some records show that this disk "was rejected for an unsatisfactory ultrasonic indication", that an outside laboratory performed an ultrasound inspection of this disk, that this disk was subsequently returned to GE, and that this disk should have been scrapped.  The FAA report stated, "There is no record of warranty claim by GEAE for defective material and no record of any credit for GEAE processed by Alcoa or TIMET".   
  
GE records of the second disk having the serial number of the crash disk indicate that it was made with an RMI Titanium Company titanium billet supplied by Alcoa.  Research of GE's records showed no other titanium parts were manufactured at GE from this RMI titanium billet during the period of 1969 to 1990.  GE records indicate that final finishing and inspection of the crash disk were completed on December 11, 1971.  Alcoa records indicate that this RMI titanium billet was first cut in 1972 and that all forgings made from this material were for airframe parts.  If the Alcoa records were accurate, the RMI titanium could not have been used to manufacture the crash disk, indicating that the initially rejected TIMET disk with "an unsatisfactory ultrasonic indication" was the crash disk.    
  
CF6 engines like the one containing the crash disk were used to power many civilian and military aircraft at the time of the crash.   Due to concerns that the accident could recur, a large number of in-service disks were examined by ultrasound for indications of defects. The fan disks on at least two other engines were found to have defects like that of the crash disk. Prioritization and efficiency of inspections of the many engines suspected would have been aided by determination of the titanium source of the crash disk.  Chemical analyses of the crash disk intended to determine its source were inconclusive.  The NTSB report stated that if examined disks were not from the same source, "the records on a large number of GEAE disks are suspect.  It also means that any AD (Airworthiness Directive) action that is based on the serial number of a disk could fail to have its intended effect because suspect disks could remain in service."  The FAA report did not explicitly address the effect of these uncertainties on operations of military aircraft that might have contained a suspect disk.

Influence on the industry 
The NTSB investigation, after reconstructions of the accident in flight simulators, deemed that training for such an event involved too many factors to be practical. While some degree of control was possible, no precision could be achieved, and a landing with these conditions was stated to be "a highly random event".  Expert pilots were unable to reproduce a survivable landing; according to a United pilot who flew with Fitch, "Most of the simulations never even made it close to the ground". The NTSB stated that "under the circumstances the UAL (United Airlines) flight crew performance was highly commendable and greatly exceeded reasonable expectations." At the time of the crash, McDonnell Douglas had ended production of DC-10's, with the last of these being delivered to Nigeria Airways during the summer of 1989. The last passenger version of the DC-10 flew in 2014, although freighter versions continued to operate until late 2022.

Because this type of aircraft control (with loss of control surfaces) is difficult for humans to achieve, some researchers have attempted to integrate this control ability into the computers of fly-by-wire aircraft. Early attempts to add the ability to real airplanes were not very successful; the software was based on experiments performed in flight simulators where jet engines are usually modeled as "perfect" devices with exactly the same thrust on each engine, a linear relationship between throttle setting and thrust, and instantaneous response to input. Later, computer models were updated to account for these factors, and aircraft such as the F-15 STOL/MTD have been flown successfully with this software installed.

Titanium processing
The manufacturing process for titanium was changed to eliminate the type of gaseous anomaly that served as the starting point for the crack. Newer batches of titanium use much higher melting temperatures and a "triple vacuum" process in an attempt to eliminate such impurities (triple melt VAR).

Aircraft designs
Newer aircraft designs such as the McDonnell Douglas MD-11 have incorporated hydraulic fuses to isolate a punctured section and prevent a total loss of hydraulic fluid. After the United 232 accident, such fuses were installed in the number three hydraulic system in the area below the number two engine on all DC-10 aircraft to ensure sufficient control capability remained if all three hydraulic system lines should be damaged in the tail area. Although elevator and rudder control would be lost, the aircrew would still be able to control the aircraft's pitch (up and down) with stabilizer trim, and would be able to control roll (left and right) with some of the aircraft's ailerons and spoilers. Although not an ideal situation, the system provides a greater measure of control than was available to the crew of United 232.

Losing all three hydraulic systems is possible if serious damage occurs elsewhere, as nearly happened to a cargo airliner in 2002 during takeoff when a main-gear tire exploded in the wheel well. The damage in the left wing area caused total loss of pressure from the number-one and the number-two hydraulic systems. The number-three system was dented but not penetrated.

Restraints for children
Of the four children deemed too young to require seats of their own ("lap children"), one died from smoke inhalation. The NTSB added a safety recommendation to the FAA on its "List of Most Wanted Safety Improvements" in May 1999 suggesting a requirement for children younger than two years old to be restrained safely, which was removed in November 2006. The accident began a campaign directed by United Flight 232's senior flight attendant, Jan Brown Lohr, for all children to have seats on aircraft.

The argument against requiring seats on aircraft for children younger than age two is the higher cost to a family of having to buy a seat for the child, and this higher cost will motivate more families to drive instead of fly, and incur the much greater risk of driving (see Epidemiology of motor vehicle collisions).  The FAA estimates that a regulation that all children must have a seat would equate, for every one child's life saved on an aircraft, to 60 people dying in highway accidents.

Though it is no longer on the "most wanted" list, providing aircraft restraints for children younger than age two is still recommended practice by the NTSB and FAA, though it is not required by the FAA as of May 2016.  The NTSB asked the International Civil Aviation Organization to make this a requirement in September 2013.

Crew resource management

The accident has since become a good example of successful crew resource management (CRM). For much of aviation's history, the captain was considered the final authority, and crews were expected to respect the captain's expertise without question. This began to change during the 1970s, especially after the 1978 United Airlines Flight 173 crash in Portland, Oregon, and the Tenerife airport disaster. CRM, while still considering the captain as final authority, instructs crew members to speak up when they detect a problem, and instructs captains to listen to crew concerns. United Airlines instituted a CRM class during the early 1980s. The NTSB later credited this training as valuable for the success of United 232's crew in handling their emergency. The FAA made CRM mandatory after the accident.

Factors contributing to survival rate 
Of the 296 people aboard, 112 were killed and 184 survived. Haynes later identified three factors relating to the time of day that increased the survival rate:

 The accident occurred during daylight hours in good weather;
 The accident occurred as a shift change was occurring at both a regional trauma center and a regional burn center in Sioux City, allowing for more medical personnel to treat the injured;
 The accident occurred when the Iowa Air National Guard was on duty at Sioux Gateway Airport, allowing for 285 trained personnel to assist with triage and evacuation of the injured.

"Had any of those things not been there," Haynes said, "I'm sure the fatality rate would have been a lot higher."

Haynes also credited CRM as being one of the factors that saved his own life, and many others.

When Haynes died in August 2019, United Airlines issued a statement thanking him for "his exceptional efforts aboard Flight UA232".

As with the Eastern Air Lines Flight 401 crash of a similarly sized Lockheed L-1011 in 1972, the relatively shallow angle of descent likely played a large part in the relatively high survival rate. The National Transportation Safety Board concluded that under the circumstances, "a safe landing was virtually impossible".

Notable victims
 John Kenneth Stille – chemist
 Jay Ramsdell - commissioner of the Continental Basketball Association

Notable survivors
 Spencer Bailey - writer, editor, and journalist
 Al Haynes - aircraft captain
 Helen Young Hayes - investment fund manager
 Michael R. Matz - Olympian and racehorse trainer
 Jerry Schemmel - former radio broadcaster of the Denver Nuggets and Colorado Rockies
 Pete Wernick - banjo player and member of American bluegrass ensemble Hot Rize, who managed to resume performing two days after the crash

Depictions 
 The accident was the subject of an 11th-season episode of the documentary series Mayday (also known as Air Crash Investigation), titled "Impossible Landing". The episode featured interviews with survivors and showed actual footage of the crash.
 The accident was the subject of the 1992 television movie A Thousand Heroes, also known as Crash Landing: The Rescue of Flight 232.
The episode "Engineering Disasters" (season 6, episode 18) of Modern Marvels featured the crash.
 The accident was featured in an episode of Seconds From Disaster (S2E7 9/13/05 "Crash Landing in/at Sioux City") on the National Geographic Channel and MSNBC Investigates on the MSNBC news channel.
 The History Channel distributed a documentary named Shockwave; a portion of Episode 7 (originally aired January 25, 2008) detailed the events of the crash.
 The episode "A Wing and a Prayer" of Survival in the Sky (UK title: Black Box) featured the accident.
 The Biography Channel series I Survived... explained in detail the events of the crash through passenger Jerry, flight attendant Jan Brown Lohr, and pilot Alfred Haynes.
 The episode "Crisis in the Cockpit" (Season 2, Episode 1) of Why Planes Crash on The Weather Channel featured the accident.
 The 1999 play Charlie Victor Romeo (made into a film in 2013) dramatically reenacted the incident using transcripts from the cockpit voice recorder (CVR).
 The 1991 novel Cold Fire, by Dean Koontz, includes a fictional crash based on Flight 232.
 The 1993 film Fearless portrayed a fictional plane crash based in part on the crash of Flight 232.
 In 2016, The House Theatre of Chicago produced United Flight 232. The play was a new work directed and adapted by Vanessa Stalling and based on the book Flight 232 by Laurence Gonzales. Surviving crew members attended the play in April 2016, and the production was subsequently nominated for six Equity Jeff Awards, winning two.
 In 2021, the accident was covered in episode 5 of the UK TV series Plane Crash Recreated.

Survivor accounts
 Dennis Fitch described his experiences in Errol Morris's television show First Person, episode "Leaving the Earth".
 Martha Conant told her story of survival to her daughter-in-law, Brittany Conant, on "Storycorps" during NPR's Morning Edition of January 11, 2008.
 Flight 232: A Story of Disaster and Survival by Laurence Gonzales (2014, W. W. Norton & Company).
 Miracle in the Cornfield – an inside survivor narrative  by Joseph Trombello (1999, PrintSource Plus, Appleton, WI).
 When the World Breaks Your Heart: Spiritual Ways of Living With Tragedy by Gregory S. Clapper, a chaplain in the National Guard who relates the stories of some of the survivors he aided in the aftermath of the crash (1999; 2016, Wipf and Stock).
 Chosen to Live: The Inspiring Story of Flight 232 Survivor Jerry Schemmel by Jerry Schemmel with Kevin Simpson (Victory Pub. Co.,1996). 
 Spencer Bailey discussed his experiences on the Time Sensitive podcast, in a 2019 interview with Andrew Zuckerman.

Flight 232 Memorial

The Flight 232 Memorial was built along the Missouri River in Sioux City, Iowa, to commemorate the heroism of the flight crew and the rescue efforts the Sioux City community undertook after the crash.  It features a statue of Iowa National Guard Lt. Col. Dennis Nielsen from a news photo that was taken that day while he was carrying a three-year-old to safety.

Similar accidents 
The odds against all three hydraulic systems failing simultaneously had previously been calculated as low as a billion to one. Yet such calculations assume that multiple failures must have independent causes, an unrealistic assumption, and similar flight control failures have indeed occurred:

 In 1971, a Boeing 747, operating as Pan Am 845, struck approach light structures for the reciprocal runway as it lifted off the runway at San Francisco Airport. Major damage to the belly and landing gear resulted, which caused the loss of hydraulic fluid from three of its four flight control systems. The fluid which remained in the fourth system gave the captain very limited control of some of the spoilers, ailerons, and one inboard elevator. That was sufficient to circle the plane while fuel was dumped and then to make a hard landing. There were no fatalities, but there were some injuries.
 In 1981, a Lockheed L-1011, operating as Eastern Airlines Flight 935, suffered a similar failure of its tail-mounted number two engine. The shrapnel from that engine inflicted damage on all four of its hydraulic systems, which were also close together in the tail structure. Fluid was lost in three of the four systems. The fourth hydraulic system was struck by shrapnel, but not punctured. The hydraulic pressure remaining in that fourth system enabled the captain to land the plane safely with some limited use of the outboard spoilers, the inboard ailerons, and the horizontal stabilizer, plus differential engine power of the remaining two engines. There were no injuries.
 On August 12, 1985, Japan Airlines Flight 123, a Boeing 747-146SR, suffered a rupture of the pressure bulkhead in its tail section, caused by undetected damage during a faulty repair to the rear bulkhead after a tailstrike seven years earlier. Pressurized air subsequently rushed out of the bulkhead and blew off the plane's vertical stabilizer, also severing all four of its hydraulic control systems. The pilots were able to keep the plane airborne for 32 minutes using differential engine power, but without any hydraulics or the stabilizing force of the vertical stabilizer, the plane eventually crashed in mountainous terrain. There were only 4 survivors among the 524 on board. This accident is the deadliest single-aircraft accident in history.
 In 1994, RA85656, a Tupolev Tu-154 operating as Baikal Airlines Flight 130, crashed near Irkutsk shortly after departing from Irkutsk Airport, Russia. Damage to the starter caused a fire in engine number two (located in the rear fuselage). High temperatures during the fire destroyed the tanks and pipes of all three hydraulic systems. The crew lost control of the aircraft. The out-of-control plane, at a speed of 275 knots, hit the ground at a dairy farm and burned. All 124 passengers and crew, as well as a dairyman on the ground, died.
 In 2003, OO-DLL, a DHL Airbus A300, was struck by a surface-to-air missile shortly after departing from Baghdad International Airport, Iraq. The missile struck the port-side wing, rupturing a fuel tank and causing the loss of all three hydraulic systems. With the flight controls disabled, the crew used differential thrust to execute a safe landing at Baghdad.

The disintegration of a turbine disc, leading to loss of control, was a direct cause of two major aircraft disasters in Poland:

 On March 14, 1980, LOT Polish Airlines Flight 007, an Ilyushin Il-62, attempted a go-around when the crew experienced troubles with a gear indicator. When thrust was applied, the low-pressure turbine disc in engine number 2 disintegrated because of material fatigue; parts of the disc damaged engines number 1 and 3 and severed control pushers for both horizontal and vertical stabilizers. After 26 seconds of uncontrolled descent, the aircraft crashed, killing all 87 people on board.
 On May 9, 1987, improperly assembled bearings in Il-62M engine number 2 on LOT Polish Airlines Flight 5055 overheated and exploded during cruise over the village of Lipinki, causing the shaft to break in two; this caused the low-pressure turbine disc to spin to enormous speeds and disintegrate, damaging engine number 1 and cutting the control pushers. The crew managed to return to Warsaw, using nothing but trim tabs to control the crippled aircraft, but on the final approach, the trim controlling links burned and the crew completely lost control over the aircraft. Soon after, it crashed on the outskirts of Warsaw; all 183 on board died. Had the plane stayed airborne for 40 seconds more, it would have been able to reach the runway.

In contrast to deploying landing gear:

 On August 15, 2019, Ural Airlines Flight 178, an Airbus A321, encountered a flock of seagulls resulting in a bird strike that caused fires in both CFM56-5 engines just after takeoff from Zhukovsky International Airport, Moscow, Russia. The pilots decided to turn off both engines and make a hard landing in a nearby cornfield only  from Zhukovsky International Airport. The pilot chose not to lower the landing gear in order to skid more effectively over the corn. Upon landing, although fully laden with fuel, no subsequent fire in the fuselage occurred and everyone on board the flight survived. 74 people were injured, none severely.

See also 
 List of aircraft accidents and incidents resulting in at least 50 fatalities
 2003 Baghdad DHL attempted shootdown incident, an incident in which an airplane was successfully landed using differential thrust after complete loss of hydraulic flight control systems

Notes

References

External links 

 
NTSB Accident report of United Airlines Flight 232

 Cockpit voice-recorder transcript (pdf) (NB contains error)
 A talk given by the pilot describing the crash at NASA Dryden in 1991

 Siouxland Chamber Of Commerce: Remembering Flight 232 (Picture of memorial depicting Lt. Colonel Dennis Nielsen carrying Spencer Bailey)
 "17th Anniversary Tribute of Flight 232"
 News report with video of crash landing of Flight 232, ABC News, July 19, 1989
 Pre-crash photos from Airliners.net
 Martha Conant tells her story of surviving the crash.
  – 1992 TV movie
 Errol Morris' First Person (one hour documentary video, accident recounting by Denny Fitch)

 
 
 

Aviation accidents and incidents in the United States in 1989
1989 in Iowa
Airliner accidents and incidents in Iowa
Airliner accidents and incidents caused by mechanical failure
Sioux City, Iowa
232
Accidents and incidents involving the McDonnell Douglas DC-10
July 1989 events in the United States
Airliner accidents and incidents involving uncontained engine failure
Aviation accidents and incidents caused by loss of control
Aviation accidents and incidents in 1989